Ron Lea is a Canadian actor, best known for his roles in Doc, Street Legal, and This is Wonderland. Lea also served as a director on some episodes of Doc.

Filmography

Film

Television

External links

Lea bio

References

Living people
Canadian male television actors
Canadian male film actors
Canadian male voice actors
Concordia University alumni
National Theatre School of Canada alumni
20th-century Canadian male actors
21st-century Canadian male actors
Year of birth missing (living people)